The 35th edition of the Clásico RCN was held from March 11 to March 20, 1995, in Colombia. The stage race, with an UCI rate of 2.4, started in Medellín, and finished in Bogotá. RCN stands for "Radio Cadena Nacional" one of the oldest and largest radio networks in the nation.

Stages

1995-03-11: Medellín — Cerro Nutibara (5.8 km)

1995-03-12: Caldas — Pereira (234 km)

1995-03-13: Pereira — Cali (201.4 km)

1995-03-14: Cali — Armenia (185.6 km)

1995-03-15: Armenia — Espinal (166.5 km)

1995-03-16: Espinal — Mosquera (137 km)

1995-03-17: Tocancipá — Sogamoso (175 km)

1995-03-18: Circuito Mundiales Ciclismo Duitama (138 km)

1995-03-19: Paipa — Tunja (42 km)

1995-03-20: Circuito Parque Nacional (136 km)

Final classification

Teams 

Pony Malta-Kelme PRF

Le Groupement (Francia) PRF

Manzana Postobón PRF

Aguardiante Antioqueño-Lotería de Medellín

Gasesosas Glacial

Lituania - Mixto

Manzana Postobón Aficionado

Ron Medellín-Lotería de Medellín

Pony Malta–Avianca

Línea Gacela-Gobernación de Boyacá

Cicloases-Cundinamarca

Provincia Cundinamarca

Mixto

See also 
 1995 Vuelta a Colombia

References 
 

Clásico RCN
Clasico RCN
Clasico RCN
Clasico RCN